Karl Treiber (born 4 December 1955) is a New Zealand cricketer. He played in 27 first-class and 15 List A matches for Northern Districts from 1979 to 1988.

See also
 List of Northern Districts representative cricketers

References

External links
 

1955 births
Living people
New Zealand cricketers
Northern Districts cricketers
People from Lendava